Shri Ramswaroop Memorial University (SRMU) is a private university in Barabanki, Uttar Pradesh, India. It was established in July 2012.

The university was established in 2012 under UP State Govt. ACT 1. It holds recognition from the University Grants Commission (UGC) and the All India Council of Technical Education (AICTE). SRMU is a member of the Association of Indian Universities (AIU). It offers courses approved by the Council of Architecture (COI), National Council for Teacher Education (NCTE), Pharmacy Council of India (PCI), and Bar Council of India (BCI).

References

External links

Private universities in Uttar Pradesh
Education in Barabanki, Uttar Pradesh
Educational institutions established in 2012
2012 establishments in Uttar Pradesh